Steeton with Eastburn is a civil parish within the City of Bradford Metropolitan District, West Yorkshire, England.  Historically part of the West Riding of Yorkshire, it has, according to the 2001 census, a population of 4,277, increasing to 4,375 at the 2011 Census.   The parish includes the villages of Steeton and Eastburn.

It has a small parish school and public transport links to local towns and cities. It also has a local newsagents, a transport cafe and a children's park. On the outskirts of Steeton is Steeton and Silsden Station. Cricketer's Walk takes you to the cricket and football pitch.

Located in the parish is Airedale General Hospital, which lies between Steeton and Eastburn.

History
The Domesday Book lists Steeton and Eastburn as belonging to Gamal Barn including 5¼ carucates of ploughland (630 acres/262 ha). The Norman conquest of England made it part of the lands of Gilbert Tison, but by 1118 Tison had suffered a demotion and his lands returned to the king. They were then given to Lord Percy.

Governance
The parish is part of the Craven ward of the Metropolitan borough of the City of Bradford, part of the Metropolitan county of West Yorkshire.

References

External links 

 .

Civil parishes in West Yorkshire
Geography of the City of Bradford